The Orange E200 was the first SPV (Sound Pictures Video) mobile phone to include a built in camera together with better battery life and ergonomics.

Features

General
Form factor: open
Dimensions (W×D×H): 48.7 × 116.7 × 23.3 mm
Weight: 120 g
Screen type: 16-bit TFT (65,536 colours)
Screen resolution (pixels): 176 × 220
Internal memory: 32 MB
Expansion slot: SD/MMC (8 MB card supplied)
Talk time: 3 hours
Standby time: 72 hours

Networks
2G (GSM): 900, 1800, 1900
2.5G: GPRS

Connectivity
Infrared
Bluetooth
PC synchronisation (ActiveSync)
Docking unit
Cable connectivity (USB)

Software and services
Operating system: Windows Mobile
Messaging: SMS, MMS
Email: POP3, IMAP4
PIM functions: Pocket Outlook
Other software: Pocket Internet Explorer, MSN Messenger, Windows Media Player, Jawbreaker, Solitaire, Voice Notes manager, Pocket Slideshow, Dockware, Rebound, CodeWallet Pro, eWallet, List Pro, PowerTasks.

Phone features
Vibrating call alert     
Polyphonic ringtones    
Voice dialling    
Voice recording    
MP3 player    
Speakerphone     
Headset jack     
Camera

HTC mobile phones
Windows Mobile Standard devices